"Heroes & Thieves" is a song on Vanessa Carlton's third studio album of the same name.

Charts

Credits and personnel

Vanessa Carlton: Piano, Keyboards, vocals, group vocals
Tony Fredianelli: guitar
Jon Evans: bass
Matt Chamberlain: drums, percussion
Carl Kihlstedt: orchestrator
Melissa Reese: background and group vocals
Dionzya Sutton: group vocals
Lyn Berry: group vocals

Notes

2007 songs
Vanessa Carlton songs
Songs written by Stephan Jenkins
Songs written by Vanessa Carlton